Baro Empire Hill or Sir Lugard Empire Hill is a 150 ft ground level hill, tourist and location of the Colonial Nigeria high frequency radio station that was installed by Sir Fredrick Lugard at Baro, Nigeria.

History 
The 110 years Radio station is a 25 kilowatt solid state analogue transmitter a high frequency radio and the hill was where the colony masters built their administrative residents for middle level staff including military and civilians cemetery and playing ground of the colonial workers who died during their service, although Sir Lugard respectively used caravan in climbing the hill while his soldiers trek.

The hill has a view from River Niger 15 km to the river and remains the Sir Lugard first head office at the summit and the station was where he communicated with Queen Elizabeth and others were made thou the hill is an historical place in country were mostly every year it attract attention from other state.

The Hill is 12 km away from the Baro Port, a port that is used for transportation of goods by the colony masters in that days and the river flows through the River Niger forming hinterland with railway that links to many terminus and also warehouse that goods is store by business people from other countries.

Notes 

Mountains of Nigeria
Colonial Nigeria
Niger State
Tourist attractions in Nigeria